Thomas Valkvæ Olsen (born May 18, 1993) is a Norwegian professional ice hockey player for Frisk Asker of the Fjordkraftligaen and the Norwegian national team.

He participated in the 2017 IIHF World Championship.

Career statistics

Regular season and playoffs

International

References

External links

1993 births
Living people
BIK Karlskoga players
Frisk Asker Ishockey players
Leksands IF players
Norwegian ice hockey forwards
People from Asker
Norwegian expatriate sportspeople in Sweden
Södertälje SK players
Bratislava Capitals players
Krefeld Pinguine players
Sportspeople from Viken (county)
Norwegian expatriate sportspeople in Slovakia
Norwegian expatriate sportspeople in Germany
Norwegian expatriate ice hockey people
Expatriate ice hockey players in Germany
Expatriate ice hockey players in Sweden
Expatriate ice hockey players in Slovakia